Robert J. Johnson is a name which could refer to:

Robert J. Johnson (priest), an American Roman Catholic priest
A number of men named Robert Johnson mistakenly placed on the No Fly List